Vitaly Gennadyevich Savelyev (born January 18, 1954) is a Russian businessman and politician serving as the Minister of Transport since 10 November 2020. Previously, he served as the chairman and CEO of Aeroflot, Russia's largest airline, from 2009 to 2020.

Biography 
Vitaly Savelyev was born on January 18, 1954, in Tashkent.  In 1977,  he graduated from the Leningrad Polytechnic Institute (Mechanical Engineering), and earned a PhD in economics in 1986 from the Leningrad Engineering and Economics Institute.

From 1977 to 1984, Vitaly Savelyev worked at the USSR Ministry of Energy (Sayano-Shushenskaya Dam). He became Deputy Director of the All-Union SevZapMetallurgMontazh Trust in 1984, and Deputy Director of the GlavLeningradEngStroy Chief Directorate in 1987. In 1989, he was named President of Russian-American DialogInvest JV, Chairman of the Executive Board of Rossiya Bank in 1993, and Chairman of the Executive Board of Menatep in 1995. In 2001-2002, he was Deputy Chairman of the Executive Board of OJSC Gazprom, 

 2001 − present — Member of the Council of the Association of Russian Banks
 2002 − 2004 — Gros United Company, Vice-President
 2004 − 2007 — Ministry of Economic Development and Trade, Deputy Minister
 2007 − 2009 — AFK Sistema, First Vice-President
 2009 − present — OJSC Aeroflot – Russian Airlines, Director General
 2020 − present - Minister of Transport 
Vitaly Savelyev served as chairman of the boards at All-Russia Exhibition Centre, OJSC Russian Development Bank, MTS, Komstar, OJSC SMM, CJSC SkyLink, and Shiam Telelink.

In 2010, Russian president Vladimir Putin tasked Vitaly Savelyev to transform Aeroflot in Russia's first full-fledged airline group. Many regional carriers were merged with Aeroflot. In 2013, he made Aeroflot the main sponsor of the UK soccer team Manchester United. He introduced Aeroflot's new low-cost airline Pobeda in 2014 and actively contributed to bend Russia's aviation code to favor the development of airline activities. In June 2017, he announced that 40% of Aeroflot's fleet would be composed of domestic aircraft (including Irkut aircraft). Between 2009 and 2017, the number of passengers carried by Aeroflot grew from 8.9 million to 50.1 million. In August 2018, he was reelected CEO of Aeroflot.

In 2018, the US added Vitaly Saveley in its "Kremlin List", not a sanction, rather a way to identify Russia's top economic agents.

Minister of Transport

On 9 November 2020, Prime Minister Mikhail Mishustin nominated Savelyev for the Minister of Transport after the resignation of Yevgeny Dietrich. On 10 November, Savelyev's candidacy was approved by the State Duma and on the same day, President Vladimir Putin signed a decree appointing Savelyev to the post of Minister.

Personal life 
Savelyev was a boxer and achieved the rank of Candidate for Master of Sport of the USSR. He is married and has two sons and one daughter.

Honours and awards
 Order of Honour (Russian Federation)
 Medal "In Commemoration of the 300th Anniversary of Saint Petersburg"
 Medal "In Commemoration of the 1000th Anniversary of Kazan"
 “Leader of the Year” category winner at “Person of the Year 2011” award according to RosBusinessConsulting (RBC), Russia’s leading Internet holding company  (2012).

References and notes

External links

1954 births
Aeroflot
Living people
Russian businesspeople
Recipients of the Order of Honour (Russia)
Engineers from Tashkent
Chief executives in the airline industry
Peter the Great St. Petersburg Polytechnic University alumni
United Russia politicians
Government ministers of Russia
Russian individuals subject to European Union sanctions
Politicians from Tashkent